Tienmutrechus dispersipunctis is a species of beetle in the family Carabidae, the only species in the genus Tienmutrechus.

References

Trechinae